Kenneth S. White was a member of the Wisconsin State Senate.

Biography
White was born Kenneth Sidney White on January 17, 1897, in River Falls, Wisconsin where he graduated from River Falls High School in 1914. He attended the University of Wisconsin-River Falls, the University of Minnesota Law School and the University of Wisconsin Law School. During World War I, he served with the United States Army in the American Expeditionary Forces. On June 13, 1924, White married Helen Dorothy Kyle. He died on December 10, 1976.

Political career
White was elected to the Senate in 1936. He had previously been District Attorney of Pierce County, Wisconsin and a member of the Pierce County Board. From 1954 to 1956, he was a judge on the Wisconsin Circuit Court. Additionally, White was a delegate to the 1936 Republican National Convention.

References

External links
The Political Graveyard

People from River Falls, Wisconsin
Republican Party Wisconsin state senators
Wisconsin lawyers
Military personnel from Wisconsin
United States Army soldiers
United States Army personnel of World War I
University of Wisconsin–River Falls alumni
University of Minnesota Law School alumni
University of Wisconsin Law School alumni
1897 births
1976 deaths
20th-century American politicians
20th-century American lawyers